Epermenia septicodes is a moth in the family Epermeniidae. It was described by Edward Meyrick in 1917. It is found in Sri Lanka.

The wingspan is about 14 mm. The forewings are deep yellow ochreous, the base of the costa suffused with blackish grey, and with some scattered scales along it to the middle. There is a narrow irregular blackish-grey fascia from the middle of the dorsum towards the middle of the costa, but not reaching it, as well as a transverse blackish-grey spot from the tornus not reaching the costa, and another crossing the wing midway between this and the apex, connected with it by a terminal streak. The hindwings are grey.

References

Epermeniidae
Moths described in 1917
Taxa named by Edward Meyrick
Moths of Sri Lanka